Madame X is a 1966 American drama film directed by David Lowell Rich and starring Lana Turner. It is based on the 1908 play Madame X by French playwright Alexandre Bisson.

Plot
Holly Parker, a lower-class woman, marries into the rich Anderson family, and her husband Clayton is a diplomat with strong political aspirations. Her mother-in-law Estelle looks down on her and keeps a watchful eye on her activities. Lonely and reclusive during Clayton's long, frequent assignments abroad, Holly forms a relationship with a well-known playboy, Phil Benton. Clayton suddenly returns and informs Holly that he has secured a promotion in Washington, D.C., where he wishes to take Holly and their son Clay to begin a regular family life. Holly agrees and goes to Phil's apartment to end their relationship. Phil reacts by trying to physically force Holly to stay, but tumbles down a staircase in the struggle and dies. Holly panics and leaves the scene. She is confronted by Estelle, who had hired a detective to follow her and knows about Phil's accident. Estelle blackmails Holly into disappearing to Europe under a false identity rather than facing murder charges and ruining her husband's political career with the scandal. Estelle arranges for Holly to be secreted away at night from the family yacht, never to see her husband or son again.

Holly, devastated by the loss of her son, falls ill with pneumonia on the side of a European street and is rescued by a charming pianist named Christian who helps her receive medical treatment and recuperate under a nurse's care. Holly and Christian grow close as she accompanies him on tour, but when he proposes marriage, she declines and then runs away from Christian. Holly slowly sinks into depravity and alcoholism, including a one-night stand with a man who steals her money and jewelry.

With Estelle's blackmail payments cut off, Holly goes to Mexico where she lives in a sleazy apartment and cannot afford her rent. She befriends an American neighbor named Dan Sullivan, who plies her with alcohol that causes her to tell him about her past with Clayton. He persuades Holly to join him in New York to work for him, but while there, she realizes that he is actually trying to blackmail Clayton, who is now governor of the state and a leading candidate for his party's presidential nomination. Holly shoots and kills Sullivan when he threatens to expose her deception to her son. The police arrest her and, refusing to reveal her identity, she signs a confession with the letter "X" and refuses to speak. The court-appointed defense attorney happens to be her son, Clay Jr., though she does not recognize him.

Holly refuses to reveal her name throughout the trial, saying nothing in her defense. Clay, in his first trial as a lawyer, devises a defense strategy to paint Sullivan as a career criminal who caused his own death. At the end of the trial the prosecutor is giving his summation to the jury and says that Clay is the son of the governor and states his full name. Holly spots Clayton Sr. in the gallery and suddenly realizes that her attorney is in fact her long-lost son. Holly takes the stand, admitting that she killed Sullivan to protect her son, who believes her to be dead, so he will not know the type of woman she has become.

While the jury is deliberating, Clay, who has grown close to Holly despite not knowing that she is his mother, visits her in her holding cell and implores her to reach out to her son. She does not reveal her identity to him but tells him he has been like a son to her. Then, having spent her final moments with her son and overcome with emotion, she dies suddenly. Clay tells his father that he had come to love "X".

Cast

Production
Producer Ross Hunter, who had enjoyed great success remaking projects, had long been interested in bringing the Bisson play to the screen, but MGM, which had produced film adaptations in 1929 and 1937, owned the rights. After reading the play again at a bookstore, Hunter became enthusiastic again. "I knew that if I kept the trial scene and brought the rest up to date I'd have something," he said.

Hunter announced the film in May 1962 as part of a slate of six projects, also including The Thrill of It All, The Chalk Garden, If a Man Answers, a new Tammy film and a remake of The Dark Angel. The script was written by Jean Holloway, who had written for Hunter in radio, despite the fact that the play had been enacted many times before. "You really have to tell a whole new story," said Holloway.

Lana Turner, who had made Imitation of Life and Portrait in Black for Hunter, was enlisted as the film's star from the beginning. In October 1962, Hunter said that he hoped that Douglas Sirk would direct.

"Tearjerkers are more difficult to make than any other type of movie," said Hunter. "Critics would seem to categorize them and look down on them; it is word of mouth that is their best press agent. It's all very sad in a way; maybe this is why we're not building great woman stars for audiences today. Audiences need to let their emotions out."

Hunter signed a seven-year contract with Universal in November 1964, with Madame X among the leading projects. In February 1965, Keir Dullea was announced. Gig Young was offered the older male lead but asked for too much money, so Hunter hired John Forsythe.

Hunter said he knew that he needed "the one scene the public would remember", the trial scene. He modernized the play and introduced new characters. "Now we have a mother and child relationship that should be seen by parents and children alike," said Hunter. "And I believe that for the first time since The Bad and the Beautiful, Lana is giving a really great performance."

Shooting
Filming started in March 1965. The film was a co-production between Universal and Turner's company, Eltee.

In May, Hedda Hopper reported that Turner was treating Hunter "like a dog" and was "nothing but trouble" on the set.

Soundtrack
The film contains an original song by Austrian composer and conductor Willy Mattes (also known as Charles Wildman) titled "Love Theme from Madame X" (alternatively named "Swedish Rhapsody"). It was recorded by George Greeley for his 1957 album The World's Ten Greatest Popular Piano Concertos.

Reception
In 2008, the film was named as one of the 100 nominees in the American Film Institute's Top 10 list of courtroom dramas.

See also
 Madame X

References

External links

1966 films
1966 drama films
American drama films
American films based on plays
Films directed by David Lowell Rich
Films produced by Ross Hunter
Films scored by Frank Skinner
Universal Pictures films
1960s English-language films
1960s American films